Psammopolia insolens is a moth of the family Noctuidae. It occurs on Pacific Coast sand beaches in central California from Carmel to Bodega Bay, Sonoma County. Most specimens are from near San Francisco.

Adults are on wing in May and from mid-September through October.

External links
A Revision of Lasionycta Aurivillius (Lepidoptera, Noctuidae) for North America and notes on Eurasian species, with descriptions of 17 new species, 6 new subspecies, a new genus, and two new species of Tricholita Grote

Hadeninae